Kamikaze 1989 is a 1982 West German cyberpunk thriller film co-written and directed by Wolf Gremm, based on the 1964 novel Murder on the Thirty-First Floor by Per Wahlöö.

It stars Rainer Werner Fassbinder as a detective investigating a string of bombings that lead to a corporate media conspiracy. At the Festival Internacional de Cinema do Porto, Fantasporto, for 1984, the film won the Critic's Award and received a nomination for the International Fantasy Film Award. The soundtrack was composed by Tangerine Dream founder Edgar Froese.

Plot
Germany in 1989. The country is rich, all problems seem to have been solved, there is no pollution and there is no unemployment.  Alcohol has been banned, but freedom has been eradicated.  For example, home-grown vegetables are banned, there are no more suicides (only "unexpected deaths"), television ensures peace and quiet with programs such as the annual laughing competition (which is ranked alongside Einstein and Napoleon) and the always positive weather report, the police (symbol: fist with stretched thumb) with their action against "Prokos" for order.  All media are in the hands of a corporation whose management belongs to one and the same family.  Only in the comic series of the Blue Panther, which is a caricature of the high-handed company boss, and his opponent Krysmopompas, criticism is articulated.

When the company was threatened with a bomb explosion that did not materialize, Lieutenant Jansen was given four days by the police chief to investigate the case.  Jansen, an eccentric in a leopard suit and "third degree" alcoholic, is a somewhat squeamish policeman who has solved all of his previous cases.

From the start, the case seems to be related to the mysterious 31st floor of the corporate building.  The paper on which the threat was received suggests a person from the group as the perpetrator.  After the company's HR manager died an “unexpected death”, the CEO's nephew was initially suspected, but Jansen can immediately rule out that he was the perpetrator (but this does not prevent him from using acoustic torture methods).  Other suspects are the former company employee Zerling, who is involved in the appearance of the Blue Panther, the television presenter Barbara, also an alcoholic, and the management assistant Elena Farr.

Again and again Jansen is offered the role of crysmopompas by unknown and well-known figures, which Jansen does not really accept.  When Jansen and his assistant MK1 Anton are followed by the CEO's nephew, he dies in an accident on the autobahn.

Finally, the real perpetrator, the intellectual Weiss, presents himself.  He tells Jansen about the 31st floor.  There, the last critically thinking publicists are silenced by working on writings whose publications are endlessly delayed.  Weiss wrote another threatening letter, but again did not plant a bomb.  But the group did that itself to finally silence its already mouthed employees from the 31st floor.

Cast
 Rainer Werner Fassbinder: Police Lieutenant Jansen
 Günther Kaufmann: MK1 Anton
 Arnold Marquis: Chief of police
 Boy Gobert: Group Chief Executive
 Richy Müller: nephew
 Jörg Holm: Vice-president
 Brigitte Mira: Human Resources Director
 Hans Wyprächtiger: Zerling
 Nicole Heesters: Barbara
 Petra Jokisch: Elena Farr
 Franco Nero: Weiss

References

External links 
 

1982 films
1980s science fiction thriller films
German science fiction thriller films
Cyberpunk films
Films based on science fiction novels
Films based on Swedish novels
Films set in the future
1980s German-language films
West German films
1980s German films